Dessert is a course that concludes a meal.

Dessert may also refer to:

Arts, entertainment, and media
 Dessert (album), a 2007 album by Chocolove
 Dessert (magazine), a Japanese manga magazine
 "Dessert" (song), a 2015 song by Dawin
 Desserts (film), a 1998 short film

Foods and beverages
 Dessert wine, a sweet wine typically served with dessert

See also
Just deserts (disambiguation)
Just desserts (disambiguation)